Timothy Coit Johnson is an American economist currently the Karl and Louise Schewe Professor of Finance at the University of Illinois at Urbana-Champaign. In 1992, he was elected fellow in perpetuity of the Metropolitan Museum of Art.

References

Year of birth missing (living people)
Living people
University of Illinois faculty
21st-century American engineers